Ain's 1st constituency is one of five French legislative constituencies in the department of Ain. It is currently represented by Xavier Breton of The Republicans (LR).

Historic representation

Elections

2022

2017

2012

2007

References

External links 
Results of legislative elections from 2002 to 2017 by constituency (Ministry of the Interior) 
Results of legislative elections from 1958 to 2012 by constituency (CDSP Sciences Po) 
Results of elections from 1958 to present by constituency (data.gouv.fr) 

1